Starling is a family of birds.

Starling may also refer to:

Places
Starling, Edmonton, Alberta, Canada
Starling, Greater Manchester, a settlement in the Metropolitan Borough of Bury, England

Arts, entertainment, and media

Fictional characters
Starling, a member of the Birds of Prey in DC Comics
Starling, a fictional character in the animated television show Storm Hawks
Clarice Starling, the heroine of the novel Silence of the Lambs, and of the films The Silence of the Lambs and Hannibal
 Juliet, Cordelia, and Rosalind Starling, from Suda 51's hack-and-slash zombie game Lollipop Chainsaw

Music
Starling Arrow, a cappella spirit-folk ensemble
The Starlings, 1990s alternative rock band
The Starlings, a coloratura soprano duo from the 1930–40s

Other arts, entertainment, and media
 Starlings (1988 film), a British television film by Andy Armitage in the anthology series ScreenPlay
Starlings (TV series), a British comedy drama airing on Sky1
Jim Starling, a series of novels for children written by Edmund Wallace Hildick
The Starling, a 2021 American comedy-drama film

Computing and technology 
Starling (software), a light-weight persistent queue server that speaks the MemCache protocol
STARLING, an etymological online database managed by Georgiy Starostin
Starling Framework, an open source framework for ActionScript development

Watercraft
Starling (dinghy), a popular New Zealand sailing dinghy
HMS Starling, several ships in the British Royal Navy

People
See Starling (name)

Other uses
Starling (architecture), a defensive bulwark, usually built with pilings or bricks, surrounding the supports (or piers) of a bridge or similar construction; can also be spelt sterling
Starling (structure), the supports (or piers) of a bridge
Starling Bank, commonly referred to as 'Starling'.
Starling equation, describes the net flow of fluid across a semipermeable membrane
Armstrong Whitworth Starling, a 1920s British fighter aircraft
Frank–Starling law of the heart, identified by British physiologist Ernest Starling